Stefano Dionisi (born 1 October 1966, in Rome) is an Italian actor. He has performed in more than sixty films since 1986. He is best known for portraying the 18th-century Italian castrato opera singer Farinelli in the movie of the same name.

Selected filmography

External links 
Stefano Dionisi IMDB

Italian male film actors
1966 births
Living people
Male actors from Rome
David di Donatello winners
20th-century Italian male actors
21st-century Italian male actors